The 2020–21 UMass Minutemen basketball team represented the University of Massachusetts Amherst during the 2020–21 NCAA Division I men's basketball season. The Minutemen were led by fourth-year head coach Matt McCall and played their home games at the William D. Mullins Memorial Center in Amherst, Massachusetts as members of the Atlantic 10 Conference. They finished the season 8-7, 6-4 in A-10 Play to finish in 5th place. They defeated Saint Joseph’s in the second round of the A-10 tournament before losing in the quarterfinals to Saint Louis.

Previous season
The Minutemen finished the 2019–20 season 14–17, 8–10 in A-10 play to finish in eighth place. Their season ended when the A-10 tournament and all other postseason tournaments were canceled due to the ongoing coronavirus pandemic.

Departures

Incoming transfers

2020 recruiting class

Roster

Schedule and results

|-
!colspan=9 style=| Non-conference regular season

|-
!colspan=9 style=| A-10 regular season

|-
!colspan=12 style=| A-10 tournament

		

Source

References

UMass Minutemen basketball seasons
Umass
UMass Minutemen basketball
UMass Minutemen basketball